Thomas Thomasberg (born 15 October 1974) is a Danish professional football manager and former player, who is the current head coach of Danish Superliga club Randers FC.

Playing career
As a youth player, Thomasberg played for hometown club Haverslev IF as well as Aars IK, before joining AaB in 1991. He made his debut for the first team only in 1994, after having played for the reserves in the fourth-tier Denmark Series for a number of seasons. Thomasberg played for AaB until 1999, after which he moved to FC Midtjylland. He won the Danish Superliga championship as a player with AaB in both the 1994–95 and 1998–99 seasons. In 1990, he also gained four caps for the Denmark under-16 team.

Managerial career
In 2004, Thomasberg announced his retirement and became assistant coach to Erik Rasmussen at FC Midtjylland. He later became Rasmussen's successor as the head coach. He remained in that position for a year before being dismissed on 11 August 2009 and replaced by Allan Kuhn after to a poor start to the season.

Later that year, it was confirmed that Thomasberg would take over as head coach of FC Hjørring from 1 January 2010. He held that position for half a year, during which he managed to lead the club to promotion the second-tier 1st Division. Thomasberg then became the head coach of FC Fredericia, who, however, discontinued their collaboration with Thomasberg on 8 April 2013.

After being an assistant at Randers FC in the period 2013–16, Thomasberg was presented as the new head coach for Hobro IK in the 1st Division on 5 January 2017 on a contract running until the summer of 2018.

Thomasberg since took over as head coach of Randers FC. He was originally supposed to have stepped into the role on 1 October 2018, but Randers and Hobro reached an agreement that enabled Thomasberg to take over with immediate effect in his new club as of 16 June 2018.

Managerial Statistics

Honours

Player
AaB
 Danish Superliga: 1994–95, 1998–99

References

External links
AaB Oldtimers profile

1974 births
Living people
Danish men's footballers
Danish football managers
Danish Superliga players
AaB Fodbold players
FC Midtjylland players
FC Midtjylland managers
FC Fredericia managers
Association football midfielders
Randers FC managers
Danish Superliga managers
People from Rebild Municipality
Vendsyssel FF managers
Danish 1st Division managers
Sportspeople from the North Jutland Region